The 1997 Norwegian Football Cup Final was the final match of the 1997 Norwegian Football Cup, the 92nd season of the Norwegian Football Cup, the premier Norwegian football cup competition organized by the Football Association of Norway (NFF). The match was played on 26 October 1997 at the Ullevaal Stadion in Oslo, and was contested between the First Division side Vålerenga and the Tippeligaen side Strømsgodset. Vålerenga defeated Strømsgodset 4–2 to claim the Norwegian Cup for a second time in their history.

Match

Details

References

1997
Football Cup
Vålerenga Fotball matches
Strømsgodset Toppfotball matches
Sports competitions in Oslo
1990s in Oslo
October 1997 sports events in Europe